Kambei Mori also known as Mōri Kambei Shigeyoshi , was a Japanese mathematician in the Edo period.

Life and work
Some 16th-century sources suggest that Mori studied in China, but such claims are inconclusive or rejected by historians.  What is known with certainty is that he started a school in Kyoto and he wrote several influential and widely discussed books which dealt with arithmetic and the use of the abacus.

One of his students was Yoshida Mitsuyoshi the author of Jinkōki, which is the oldest extant Japanese mathematical text.

Selected works
In a statistical overview derived from writings by and about Kambei Mori, OCLC/WorldCat encompasses 2 works in 3 publications in 1 language and 5 library holdings.

   OCLC 026976775, written division

See also
 Sangaku, the custom of presenting mathematical problems, carved in wood tablets, to the public in shinto shrines
 Soroban, a Japanese abacus
 Japanese mathematics

Notes

References 
 Endō Toshisada (1896). . Tōkyō: _.  OCLC 122770600
 Fukagawa, Hidetoshi and Tony Rothman. (2008).  Sacred Mathematics: Japanese Temple Geometry. Princeton: Princeton University Press. ; [   OCLC 181142099]
 Horiuchi, Annick. (1994).   Les Mathematiques Japonaises a L'Epoque d'Edo (1600–1868): Une Etude des Travaux de Seki Takakazu (?-1708) et de Takebe Katahiro (1664–1739). 	Paris: Librairie Philosophique J. Vrin. ;   OCLC 318334322
 Restivo, Sal P. (1992).  Mathematics in Society and History: Sociological Inquiries. Dordrecht: Kluwer Academic Publishers. ;   OCLC 25709270
 Selin, Helaine. (1997).   Encyclopaedia of the History of Science, Technology, and Medicine in Non-Western Cultures. Dordrecht: Kluwer/Springer. ;   OCLC 186451909
 Shen, Kangshen; John N. Crossley and Anthony Wah-Cheung Lun. (1999).  The Nine Chapters on the Mathematical Art: Companion and Commentary. Oxford: Oxford University Press. ; ; [   OCLC 247590975]
 David Eugene Smith and Yoshio Mikami. (1914).   A History of Japanese Mathematics. Chicago: Open Court Publishing.   OCLC 1515528 -- note alternate online, full-text copy at archive.org

External links
Sangaku

17th-century Japanese mathematicians
Japanese writers of the Edo period